Jean Labonté (born March 20, 1969) is a Canadian ice sledge hockey player.

Labonté was diagnosed with osteosarcoma in his left tibia in 1986 at the age of 17 and finally lost his leg at the age of 20, in 1990. After his amputation, Labonté turned his sights towards ice sledge hockey and made the Canadian National Sledge hockey team for the first time in 1996. He was on the Canadian team that won the 2006 sledge hockey gold medal at the 2006 Winter Paralympics in Torino. He was the captain of the Canadian Team from the 2007–08 season until his retirement after the 2009–2010 season. He studied at l'Université du Québec en Outaouais and currently works at Alcatel-Lucent as a software designer.

International career
Labonté was named on the Canadian men's national ice sledge hockey team for the first time in 1996, at the age of 26. His first international tournament was the 1996 IPC World Championships held in Nynäshamn, Sweden. Labonté was team Canada's captain from the 2007–2008 season until his retirement after the 2009–2010 season.

Labonté was the flag bearer for Canada at the 2010 Paralympic Games in Vancouver.

Career statistics

International

External links
 Player profile - Hockey Canada
 

1969 births
Living people
Sportspeople from Quebec
Canadian sledge hockey players
Paralympic sledge hockey players of Canada
Paralympic gold medalists for Canada
Paralympic silver medalists for Canada
Ice sledge hockey players at the 1998 Winter Paralympics
Ice sledge hockey players at the 2002 Winter Paralympics
Ice sledge hockey players at the 2006 Winter Paralympics
Ice sledge hockey players at the 2010 Winter Paralympics
Medalists at the 1998 Winter Paralympics
Medalists at the 2006 Winter Paralympics
Paralympic medalists in sledge hockey